St. John's Catholic College is an independent Roman Catholic co-educational secondary school based on the Missionaries of the Sacred Heart and Daughters of Our Lady of the Sacred Heart traditions. It is located in Darwin, Northern Territory, Australia, on Salonika Street. The College provides a religious and general education for day and boarding students from Year 7 to Year 12. The school was established in 1960 at its site in the central Darwin suburb of The Gardens.

History 
Originally named St John's College, it was originally established for boys only by the Bishop of Darwin, John Patrick O'Loughlin, in 1960, on a site adjacent to the Darwin Botanical Gardens. Father John Burford MSC was appointed the first Rector of the college which operated out of buildings next to St Marys Cathedral, while building commenced. In this respect the college would continue to be operated by the Missionaries of the Sacred Heart. By December 1960 enough had been completed to allow the school to move into its site. From 1961 and 1966 the college continued to grow, eventually welcoming the arrival of the first college boarders. In 1972 the Our Lady of the Sacred Heart College for girls was opened on the Mindil beach side of the site, operated by the Daughters of Our Lady of the Sacred Heart.

In December 1974, Cyclone Tracy devastated the college buildings and as a result reconstruction became a major focus of the college. In 1975, it was decided that the two colleges would be merged as a co-educational college with two schools, a Middle school and a Senior school. With 1975 being the college's 25th anniversary, it was commemorated by the construction of Jubilee Hall. The 1970s also saw the phasing out of primary schooling and the school head changing from Rector to Principal.

In 1989 a College Board was established and St John's was confirmed as an independent school of the Missionaries of the Sacred Heart. However, with the departure of Principal Father Robert Irvine at the end of the 1990s, the direct association of the Missionaries of the Sacred Heart within the college ended and led to the appointment of the first lay Principal, Gerard Keating.

In 2009, the College was purchased by the Catholic Education Office of Darwin and is now a systemic Catholic school under the leadership of the Bishop of Darwin.

Symbols
The college crest is emblazoned with an eagle, which alludes to artistic representations of the college's namesake, Saint John the Evangelist, which in turn symbolises the heights to which he rose in the first chapter of his Gospel. The quill held by the eagle represents the word of God. The motto of the College, "Strong in Faith", reflects the ethos of the college and also the religious foundations of the school.

Notable alumni 

Barry O'Farrell - former Premier of New South Wales
Maurice Rioli - Former Australian rules footballer and member of the NT Legislative Assembly
Nova Peris - The first Aboriginal Australian and the first person from the Northern Territory to win an Olympic gold medal, and a former member of the Australian Senate
Stan Tipiloura - Indigenous Australian politician and member of the NT Legislative Assembly (1987–1992)
Cyril Rioli
Daniel Rioli
Willie Rioli

See also 

 List of schools in the Northern Territory
 City of Darwin

References

External links 
 St John's College website

Catholic secondary schools in Darwin, Northern Territory
Educational institutions established in 1960
Missionaries of the Sacred Heart
1960 establishments in Australia